A Thousand Nights may refer to:

 A Thousand Nights (novel), a 2015 novel by E.K. Johnston
 A Thousand Nights (album), a 2008 album by Melanie Doane
 A Thousand Nights (song), a song by Maria Arredondo